The Castaly River is a river of New Zealand. It is in north Canterbury, northwest of the township of Parnassus, and flows generally east for  before joining the Leader River, itself a tributary of the Waiau River.

See also
List of rivers of New Zealand

References
Land Information New Zealand - Search for Place Names

Rivers of Canterbury, New Zealand
Rivers of New Zealand